Moguai is a genus of crabs. The name comes from the Chinese pinyin, which literally means "devil". It contains three species:
Moguai aloutos C. G. S. Tan & Ng, 1999
Moguai elongatum (Rathbun, 1931)
Moguai pyriforme Naruse, 2005

References

Ocypodoidea